is a Japanese idol, singer and actress. She joined the girl group AKB48 in 2009 where she participated in a number of their singles, and was one of two Japanese members to transfer and to become founding members of the Chinese idol sister group SNH48 in 2012. She then was a concurrent member of both AKB48 and SNH48 from 2013 to 2016, after which she returned to AKB48 until she graduated from the group in 2017. She has starred in three horror films. In March 2019, Suzuki Mariya join new idol group called Sotsugyosei Tokyo.

Filmography 
 Kokkuri-san: Gekijoban (2011), Eri Ōshima
 2-channel no Noroi: Shin Gekijōban, Honki (2012), Yūka Kinami
 Kokkuri-san Movie - Shin Toshi Densetsu - (2014), Mari
 Miss Machiko (2018)

References

External links
  at Flave 
 AKB48 official profile (archive) 
 SNH48 official profile (archive) 

1991 births
AKB48 members
SNH48 members
Japanese film actresses
Actors from Saitama Prefecture
Living people
Musicians from Saitama Prefecture
21st-century Japanese women singers
21st-century Japanese singers
21st-century Japanese actresses